The following lists the top 25 (end of year) charting albums on the Australian Album Charts, for the year of 1977. These were the best charting albums in Australia for 1977. The source for this year is the "Kent Music Report", known from 1987 onwards as the "Australian Music Report".

These charts are calculated by David Kent of the Kent Music Report and they are based on the number of weeks and position the records reach within the top 100 albums for each week.

source: David Kent's "Australian Chart Book 1970-1992"

Australian record charts
Top
1977 record charts